Daviesia microphylla is a species of flowering plant in the family Fabaceae and is endemic to the south-west of Western Australia. It is an openly-branched, sprawling shrub with spiny branchlets, crowded, sharply-pointed, egg-shaped phyllodes, and orange, dark red and maroon flowers.

Description

Taxonomy and naming
Daviesia microphylla was first formally described in 1864 by George Bentham in Flora Australiensis from specimens collected by James Drummond. The specific epithet (microphylla) means "small-leaved", referring to the phyllodes.

Distribution and habitat
This daviesia grows in woodland or low heath and is found in the eastern Darling Range, but had a more extensive range in the past.

Conservation status
Daviesia microphylla is listed as "not threatened" by the Department of Biodiversity, Conservation and Attractions.

References

microphylla
Eudicots of Western Australia
Plants described in 1864
Taxa named by George Bentham